The Temple of Aphrodite Urania is a temple located north-west of the Ancient Agora of Athens, dedicated to the Greek goddess Aphrodite under her epithet Urania.

The temple was built around the early 5th century BC.

According to Pausanias, the sanctuary had a marble statue of the deity sculpted by the ancient Greek sculptor Phidias: 

If still in use by the 4th century, the temple would have been closed during the persecution of pagans in the late Roman Empire.

There are a few saved stones on the slope of the hill beside the train tracks and near the temple of her husband Hephaestus.

See also
 List of Ancient Greek temples

References

Urania
Aphrodite Urania
Landmarks in Athens
Ancient Greek buildings and structures in Athens
Ancient Agora of Athens
5th-century BC religious buildings and structures